The Niagara Falls Suite is a musical composition written by Ferde Grofé in 1960, and performed at Niagara Falls in 1961.

Composition 
Grofe was commissioned in 1960 by the Niagara Falls Power Generation project to compose a symphonic suite. Grofe himself conducted the Suite as part of the ceremonies upon completion of work of the first stage of the massive project to tame Niagara Falls for electricity. This austere score makes heavy use of percussion and bass to simulate the power of the falls, excepting the light and humorous third movement.

Movements 
I. Thunder of the Waters
II. Devils' Hole Massacre - this movement commemorates the Battle of Devil's Hole
III. Honeymooners
IV. Power of Niagara

References 

Suites by Ferde Grofé
1960 compositions
Compositions for symphony orchestra
Niagara Falls
Orchestral suites